The 2006–07 Turkish Basketball League was the 41st season of the top-tier professional basketball league in Turkey. The season started on October 7, 2006. Fenerbahçe Ülker won their second national championship this season.

Regular season standings 
Last updated June 30, 2007

Tofaş and Tekelspor relegated to Turkish Second Basketball League. Antalya BŞB and Kepez Belediye will play in Turkish Basketball League in 2007–08 season.

Turkish Basketball League 2006–07 play-offs 

Last updated June 4, 2008

The 2007 Turkish Basketball League play-offs is the final phase of the 2006–07 regular season.

Quarterfinal and Semifinal series are 5-match series. The teams reaches the first 3 wins is through to the next round. The team which has won both regular season matchups starts with a 1–0 lead to the series.

Final series are 7-match series and the team reaches first 4 wins is the champion of the Turkish Basketball League.

2006/2007 play-off seedings, results, and schedules

Quarter finals 

May 4–10, 2007

Fenerbahçe Ülker (28–2) – Darüşşafaka (14–16)

Efes Pilsen (27–3) – Bandırma Banvit (15–15)

Türk Telekom (25–5) – Casa TED Kolejliler (17–13)

Galatasaray (18–12) – Beşiktaş Cola Turka (17–13)

Semifinals 

May 13–21, 2007

Fenerbahçe Ülker (28–2) – Galatasaray Café Crown (18–12)

2006/2007 League Finals 

May 25 – June 1, 2007

External links 
 Turkish Basketball League Official Website
 Turkish Basketball Federation Official Website
 TBLStat.net

References 

Turkish Basketball Super League seasons
Turkish
1